was a Japanese joshi puroresu professional wrestler. She worked for native companies in her country such as World Wonder Ring Stardom from 2016 to 2020, and Wrestle-1, in addition to having made appearances for foreign companies such as Ring of Honor, Pro-Wrestling: EVE, and some independent promotions in Mexico. Kimura was a second-generation wrestler; her mother Kyoko Kimura is a former professional wrestler.

She was a cast member on the Fuji Television and Netflix reality television series Terrace House: Tokyo 2019–2020, which is the fifth installment of the Terrace House franchise. Following a series of troubling tweets addressing online bullying directed at her from Terrace House viewers, she was found dead in her apartment in Tokyo on May 23, 2020. Her death had been ruled a suicide by December 2020.

Professional wrestling career

Early career
Prior to her professional wrestling career, Kimura won the DDT Ironman Heavymetalweight Championship one time on August 21, 2005, at a live event in Tokyo, then lost the title to her mother Kyoko.

In the 2010s, Kimura was trained at Wrestle-1's Professional Wrestling University.

Wrestle-1 (2016–2019)
After graduating the Wrestle-1 training academy, she debuted for promotion on March 30, 2016, against her classmate, Reika Saiki, in a losing effort. The pair wrestled against each other many times throughout 2016 in Wrestle-1.

On August 7, 2016, Kimura wrestled against her mother in a match. On September 18, 2016, Kimura captured her first title, the JWP Junior Championship, by defeating Yako Fujigasaki in a tournament final. She lost her JWP Junior Championship on December 28, 2016, to Yako Fujigasaki. On January 22, 2017, her mother retired. In Kyoko's retirement show, Kimura defeated her mother in a singles match and on the same show, the two teamed in a trios match in a winning effort.

During 2017, Kimura split her time between Wrestle-1, Sendai Girls' Pro Wrestling and Stardom while being a contracted performer for Wrestle-1. Kimura officially became a Wrestle-1 roster member on January 9, 2018. She made an international tour in early 2018, competing for Ring of Honor, Pro-Wrestling: EVE, and various promotions in Mexico.

On March 21, 2019, Kimura announced she was leaving Wrestle-1.

World Wonder Ring Stardom (2016–2020)
Around September 2016, Kimura also began appearing in World Wonder Ring Stardom. On October 2, 2016, Kimura teamed with her mother and Kagetsu to capture the Artist of Stardom Championship. The team vacated the titles on January 3, 2017, when Kimura was injured. Kimura eventually became a member of Stardom's heel stable, Oedo Tai. On June 21, 2017, at Stardom's Galaxy Stars 2017 event, Kimura teamed with her fellow Oedo Tai member, Kagetsu, to win the Goddess of Stardom Championship by defeating Team Jungle (Hiroyo Matsumoto and Jungle Kyona). Kimura and Kagetsu held the titles for nearly a year, successfully defending against teams such as Jungle Kyona and HZK, Io Shirai and Viper, Jungle Kyona and Natsuko Tora, HZK and Momo Watanabe, Mayu Iwatani and Tam Nakano. The team was defeated by Mayu Iwatani and Saki Kashima in 2018. Kimura left Oedo Tai on September 24, after she attacked Kagetsu.

She officially joined Stardom on March 25, 2019. On April 6, Kimura, along with Stella Grey and Sumie Sakai wrestled Jenny Rose and Oedo Tai (Kagetsu and Hazuki) in a dark match at Ring of Honor and New Japan Pro-Wrestling's G1 Supercard. On April 14, at the 2019 Stardom draft, Hana was named leader of the International Army faction. The faction was renamed, "Tokyo Cyber Squad", on April 21. On May 16, Kimura, along with her stablemates Jungle Kyona and Konami won the Artist of Stardom Championship after defeating Mayu Iwatani, Saki Kashima, and Tam Nakano.

On January 4, 2020, Kimura, along with Giulia wrestled Mayu Iwatani and Arisa Hoshiki in a dark match at New Japan Pro-Wrestling's Wrestle Kingdom 14. It was the first women's match at the Tokyo Dome since 2002. Kimura had her final match on March 24 at Stardom's Cinderella Tournament 2020, wrestling Mayu Iwatani in the first round to a draw.

During her Stardom career, she won the Artist of Stardom Championship twice and the Goddess of Stardom championship once, while also winning the 2019 5★Star GP tournament and Stardom Fighting Spirit Award.

Appearance on Terrace House and other ventures

Kimura joined the reality television series Terrace House: Tokyo 2019–2020 in September 2019, appearing on the show until her death. One episode filmed in early January 2020 showed Kimura involved in a verbal conflict with her housemate, Kai Edward Kobayashi, for damaging her wrestling attire. After the episode aired in March 2020, her actions drew criticism, name calling and racist abuse from social media users, sending her into depression. The release of new Terrace House episodes was suspended as a result of Kimura's death, and Fuji TV later cancelled the season.

Before her death, Kimura was set to co-star with Ena Fujita in the music video for the musician's June 2020 single "Dead Stroke" and Lalo the Don's "Til The Break of Don", recorded before the COVID-19 pandemic and uploaded on YouTube on May 20, 2021.

Personal life
Kimura was a daughter of Kyoko Kimura, who is also a professional wrestler. Before she was one year old, she was separated from her father. While the identity of Hana Kimura's biological father is not publicly known, Kyoko Kimura has mentioned in interviews that he is an Indonesian national and because of this, Hana Kimura was referred to as Indonesian-Japanese. She was bullied as a child because of her mixed ethnic heritage.

Death

Early in the morning of May 23, 2020, Kimura posted self-harm images on Twitter and Instagram while sharing some of the hate comments she received. She was reported dead later that day, at the age of 22. Dave Meltzer claimed three days later that the cause of death was hydrogen sulfide ingestion. By December 2020 the death was ruled a suicide.

On December 15, 2020, the police announced that they had arrested a man in his mid-20s for cyberbullying. The man, who resides in Osaka Prefecture, admitted to the allegations and was quoted by the police as saying he "couldn't forgive Kimura's attitude on the program." On March 30, 2021, the Tokyo Prosecutors Office indicted the Osaka man for online abuse directed at Kimura, but was not obliged to face trial under the indictment, as is often the case for relatively minor offenses in Japan. He was issued an order of ¥9000 (US$80) fine, which prompted concerns that the punishment was too light.  Kyoko Kimura, the late wrestler's mother, has filed a suit seeking more than $20,000 in damages from the man.

On April 5, 2021, Tokyo Metropolitan Police charged a second man in his late 30s for online abuse he sent Kimura. Metropolitan Police Department said the second man, from Fukui Prefecture, admitted to the allegations during voluntary questioning, with investigative sources quoting him as saying, "Many hateful messages had been posted, and I followed suit. I'm sorry." When asked why he did it, he said he was "simply joining in with what he saw others doing on her site."

On January 22, 2021, Kyoko Kimura filed a lawsuit with the Tokyo District Court seeking damages of around 2.94 million yen (US$27,000) against a third man for causing emotional distress to her family. According to the lawsuit, the third man, from Nagano Prefecture, posted hateful messages about Kimura's death in May 2020. On May 19, 2021, the Japanese Court Judge Momoko Ikehara ordered the third man to pay ¥1.29 million yen (US$12,000).

Legacy and tributes
On the day of Kimura's death, several professional wrestling companies such as New Japan Pro-Wrestling, National Wrestling Alliance, Ring of Honor, All Elite Wrestling, Impact Wrestling, among other companies sent their condolences. During AEW's Double or Nothing pay-per-view event, they paid tribute to Kimura and Shad Gaspard (who also died that same week).

On the May 27 episode of WWE NXT, Io Shirai and commentator Mauro Ranallo paid tribute to Hana with the following phrase: "Hana was one of the most talented female wrestlers in the world, and I was looking forward to watching her grow to see how far she could go," Io began. "I will always remember her smile that would brighten up any room she walked into. It is so important that we all love and treat each other with respect." On the May 29 episode of WWE SmackDown, Sasha Banks wore a black armband that said "HANA" in white letters. At NXT TakeOver: In Your House, Dakota Kai sported pink hair that she confirmed was dyed as a tribute to Kimura.

On June 21, World Wonder Ring Stardom had its first event during the COVID-19 pandemic and before the event, they paid tribute to Kimura with all the wrestlers around the ringside area for a ten-bell salute.

Kimura's fellow Terrace House cast member Peppe drew her in the third volume of his manga series Mingo, which was released on July 10.

On the September 3 episode of AEW Dynamite, professional wrestler Kenny Omega wore a Hana Kimura shirt on what would've been her 23rd birthday. The shirt was released on Pro Wrestling Tees with all the proceeds going to Hana's mother, Kyoko.

On June 14, 2022, Japan's parliament passed a law in which "online insults" were punishable by one year in response to Kimura's online bullying. Offenders convicted of online insults can be jailed for up to one year, or fined 300,000 yen (about $2,200).

Hana Kimura Memorial annual shows
On March 31, 2021, Kyoko Kimura, Hana's mother launched the non-profit Remember Hana, an anti-bullying organization. As a result, the "Hana Kimura Memorial" events series commenced on May 23, 2021, with the Hana Kimura Memorial Show, "Matane." The second show, "Bagus", took place on May 23, 2022.

Championships and accomplishments
Dramatic Dream Team
Ironman Heavymetalweight Championship (1 time)
JWP Joshi Puroresu
Princess of Pro-Wrestling Championship (1 time)
JWP Junior Championship (1 time)
JWP Junior Championship Tournament (2016)
Princess of Pro-Wrestling Tournament (2016)
Pro Wrestling Illustrated
Ranked No. 60 of the top 100 female wrestlers in the PWI Women's 100 in 2018
World Wonder Ring Stardom
Artist of Stardom Championship (2 times) – with Jungle Kyona and Konami (1), Kagetsu and Kyoko Kimura (1)
Goddess of Stardom Championship (1 time) – with Kagetsu
5★Star GP (2019)
Stardom Year-End Award (2 times)
Best Tag Team Award (2017) 
Fighting Spirit Award (2019)

See also
List of premature professional wrestling deaths

References

External links

1997 births
2020 deaths
2020 suicides
Japanese female professional wrestlers
Japanese people of Indonesian descent
Japanese television personalities
Sportspeople from Yokohama
Victims of cyberbullying
Suicides by poison in Japan
Female suicides
21st-century professional wrestlers
Goddess of Stardom Champions
Artist of Stardom Champions
Ironman Heavymetalweight Champions